Athenaeum may refer to:

Books and periodicals
 Athenaeum (German magazine), a journal of German Romanticism, established 1798
 Athenaeum (British magazine), a weekly London literary magazine 1828–1921
 The Athenaeum (Acadia University), a student newspaper of Acadia University, Nova Scotia
 The Daily Athenaeum, the newspaper of West Virginia University
 The Athenaeum (novel), a novel by Raul Pompéia 1888
 Atheneum Books, a children's fiction imprint of Simon & Schuster
 Athenaeum Press, an imprint of Ginn and Company

Clubs and societies
(alphabetical by city)

 Marian Miner Cook Athenaeum, Claremont McKenna College, Claremont, California, US
 Liverpool Athenaeum, Liverpool, UK
 Athenaeum Club, London, UK
 German Athenaeum, London, UK
 Ateneo de Madrid, Spain
 Manchester Athenaeum, Manchester, UK
 Athenaeum Club, Melbourne, Australia
 Athenaeum at Caltech, California Institute of Technology, Pasadena, California, US
 The Plymouth Athenaeum, Plymouth, UK
 Ateneo de Sevilla, Spain

Cultural centers
 Athenæum (Das Deutsche Haus), Indianapolis, Indiana, US
 The Athenaeum (South Africa), Port Elizabeth, South Africa
 Caracas Athenaeum, Caracas, Venezuela
 Mexican Youth Athenaeum, Mexico City, Mexico
 New Harmony's Atheneum, New Harmony, Indiana, US
 Puerto Rican Athenaeum, the English name for Ateneo Puertorriqueño, Puerta de Tierra, Puerto Rico
 Iași Athenaeum, Iași, Romania

Hotels
 The Athenaeum Hotel, Piccadilly, London, UK
 Athenaeum Hotel at the Chautauqua Institution, New York, US

Libraries
 Athenaeum Music & Arts Library, La Jolla, California, US
 Athenaeum of Philadelphia, Philadelphia, Pennsylvania, US
 Berkshire Athenaeum, Pittsfield, Massachusetts, US
 Boston Athenæum, Boston, Massachusetts, US
 Dunedin Athenaeum and Mechanics' Institute, Dunedin, Otago, NZ
 Folio: The Seattle Athenaeum, Seattle, Washington, US
 Melbourne Athenaeum, Melbourne, Australia
 Minneapolis Athenæum, the name of the first library in Minneapolis, Minnesota, US
 Portsmouth Athenæum, Portsmouth, New Hampshire, US
 Providence Athenaeum, Providence, Rhode Island, US
 Redwood Library and Athenaeum, Newport, Rhode Island, US
 Salem Athenaeum, Salem, Massachusetts, US
 St. Johnsbury Athenaeum, St. Johnsbury, Vermont, US
 Westfield Athenaeum, Westfield, Massachusetts

Museums
 Athenaeum (Alexandria, Virginia), Alexandria, Virginia, US
 Chicago Athenaeum, Chicago, Illinois
 Portsmouth Athenæum, Portsmouth, New Hampshire, US
 Wadsworth Atheneum, Hartford, Connecticut, US
 Wilcannia Athenaeum, Wilcannia, New South Wales, Australia

Schools

Europe
 Athenaeum (ancient Rome), a school founded by Emperor Hadrian
 Athenaeum Illustre of Amsterdam, Amsterdam, the Netherlands
 Athenaeum illustre, a late name for the University of Franeker (1585-1811)
 Atheneum (school), formal name of main educational track of Dutch Voorbereidend wetenschappelijk onderwijs
 Atheneum, the main variant of the voorbereidend wetenschappelijk onderwijs (vwo) in the Dutch school system
 Limerick Athenaeum, Limerick, Ireland
 Glasgow Athenaeum School of Music, predecessor institute to the Royal Conservatoire of Scotland
 Pontifical Athenaeum of Saint Anselm or Anselmianum, the Benedictine Pontifical University in Rome

North America
 Athenaeum (Tennessee), Columbia, Tennessee, US
 Athenaeum of Ohio, a seminary in Cincinnati, Ohio, US

Theaters
 Athenaeum Theatre, Sydney, aka Atheneum Hall, early cinema
 Howard Athenaeum, Boston, Massachusetts, US
 Melbourne Athenaeum, aka Athenaeum Hall, Melbourne, Australia
 Romanian Athenaeum, Bucharest, Romania
 The Plymouth Athenaeum, Plymouth, Devon, UK
 New Theatre Comique, known as Atheneum in New York City (1865)
 Warminster Athenaeum, Warminster, Wiltshire, UK

Other uses
 Athenaeum (Arcadia), a town of ancient Arcadia, Greece
 Athenaeum (band), a rock band from Greensboro, North Carolina
 Athenaeum (fort), a fort of ancient Arcadia, Greece
 Athenaeum Portrait, also known as The Athenaeum, an unfinished portrait of George Washington

See also
 Ateneum, an art museum in Helsinki, Finland
 Athénée de Luxembourg, a secondary school in Luxembourg
 Ateneo (disambiguation), Italian/Spanish
 Athenaeus (disambiguation), Greek name